Ampem is a surname. Notable people with the surname include:

 Davidson Drobo-Ampem (born 1988), German professional footballer
 Nana Yaw Ampem Darko (or George Darko) (born 1951), Ghanaian musician
 Kwamena Tuffuor Ampem, Ghanaian politician
Prince Obeng Ampem (born 1998), Ghanaian footballer